"What Is Love?"  (stylized as "What is Love?") is a song recorded by South Korean girl group Twice. It was released by JYP Entertainment on April 9, 2018, as the lead single from their fifth extended play of the same name.

Composition
"What Is Love?" was written and composed by Park Jin-young, who previously produced "Signal", and it was arranged by Lee Woo-min "collapsedone", who co-produced "Knock Knock" and "Candy Pop". According to JYP Entertainment, the song is about "the love girls would dream about or imagine after learning about it through books, movies or dramas" and it has a bright melody and uptempo dance beat incorporating trap. Tamar Herman of Billboard described the song as having "retro electro-pop styling" and an "addictive choral hook", with "digital quirks, sparkling chimes, and staccato'd percussion over the bubblegum melody".

Music video
Similar to the music video for "Cheer Up", the members of Twice portray characters from famous films in the "What Is Love" music video. Nayeon is Mia from The Princess Diaries, Jeongyeon and Sana are Molly and Sam from Ghost, Mina and Dahyun are Vic and Matthieu from La Boum, Sana and Tzuyu are Mia and Vincent from Pulp Fiction, Jeongyeon and Tzuyu are Romeo and Juliet from Romeo + Juliet, Jihyo and Jeongyeon are Itsuki/Hiroko and male Itsuki from Love Letter, Momo and Tzuyu are Mia and Sebastian from La La Land, and Dahyun and Chaeyoung are Léon and Mathilda from Léon: The Professional. The music video also has scenes showing the song's choreography, Twice at a sleepover watching the movies on TV, and Dahyun's "commercial break" that includes product placement for Acuvue contact lenses.

The music video was ranked fourth on the 2018 YouTube's Most Popular Music Videos list in South Korea. It also ranked at number 5 on the 2018 YouTube's Top Trend Music Videos in Japan.

Commercial performance 
The song debuted atop Gaon's Digital Chart and Billboard Korea'''s Kpop Hot 100. It also peaked at No. 3 and 6 on Billboard charts' World Digital Song Sales and Billboard Japan Hot 100, respectively. The song placed at number 29 at Billboard Japan Hot 100 year-end chart, and placed at number 14 in Top Streaming Songs.

"What Is Love?" surpassed 100 million streams in October 2019, becoming Twice's third consecutive Platinum certification single for streaming from the Korea Music Content Association (KMCA).

In April 2020, "What Is Love?" earned Silver streaming certification for surpassing 30 million streams on Oricon Streaming Singles Chart from the Recording Industry Association of Japan (RIAJ).

In 2021, "What Is Love?" re-charted on several music streaming services after going viral on TikTok. Over 1 million videos on TikTok have used the song as their background music. In February 2023, "What Is Love?" became Twice's first music video to reach 700 million views.

Japanese version
Twice's second compilation album #Twice2, released on March 6, 2019, includes both Korean and Japanese versions of the song. "What Is Love? (Japanese ver.)" was pre-released as a digital single on February 7, along with an accompanying music video. The Japanese lyrics were written by Risa Horie. It was first performed on Music Station Super Live'' on December 21, 2018.

Accolades

Charts

Weekly charts

Year-end charts

Certifications

|-
!scope="col" colspan="3"| Download
|-

|-

See also
 List of certified songs in South Korea
 List of Gaon Digital Chart number ones of 2018
 List of Inkigayo Chart winners (2018)
 List of K-pop Hot 100 number ones
 List of M Countdown Chart winners (2018)
 List of Music Bank Chart winners (2018)

References

2018 singles
2018 songs
Korean-language songs
Twice (group) songs
JYP Entertainment singles
Gaon Digital Chart number-one singles
Billboard Korea K-Pop number-one singles
Songs written by Park Jin-young